Gamification is the strategic attempt to enhance systems, services, organizations, and activities by creating similar experiences to those experienced when playing games in order to motivate and engage users. This is generally accomplished through the application of game-design elements and game principles (dynamics and mechanics) in non-game contexts.

Gamification is part of persuasive system design, and it commonly employs game design elements to improve user engagement, organizational productivity, flow, learning, crowdsourcing, knowledge retention, employee recruitment and evaluation, ease of use, usefulness of systems, physical exercise, traffic violations, voter apathy, public attitudes about alternative energy, and more. A collection of research on gamification shows that a majority of studies on gamification find it has positive effects on individuals. However, individual and contextual differences exist.

Techniques 
Gamification techniques are intended to leverage people's natural desires for socializing, learning, mastery, competition, achievement, status, self-expression, altruism, or closure, or simply their response to the framing of a situation as game or play. Early gamification strategies use rewards for players who accomplish desired tasks or competition to engage players. Types of rewards include points, achievement badges or levels, the filling of a progress bar, or providing the user with virtual currency. Making the rewards for accomplishing tasks visible to other players or providing leader boards are ways of encouraging players to compete.

Another approach to gamification is to make existing tasks feel more like games. Some techniques used in this approach include adding meaningful choice, onboarding with a tutorial, increasing challenge, and adding narrative.

Game design elements 
Game design elements are the basic building blocks of gamification applications. Among these typical game design elements, are points, badges, leader-boards, performance graphs, meaningful stories, avatars, and teammates.

Points 
Points are basic elements of a multitude of games and gamified applications. They are typically rewarded for the successful accomplishment of specified activities within the gamified environment and they serve to numerically represent a player's progress. Various kinds of points can be differentiated between, e.g. experience points, redeemable points, or reputation points, as can the different purposes that points serve. One of the most important purposes of points is to provide feedback. Points allow the players' in-game behavior to be measured, and they serve as continuous and immediate feedback and as a reward.

Badges 
Badges are defined as visual representations of achievements and can be earned and collected within the gamification environment. They confirm the players' achievements, symbolize their merits, and visibly show their accomplishment of levels or goals. Earning a badge can be dependent on a specific number of points or on particular activities within the game. Badges have many functions, serving as goals, if the prerequisites for winning them are known to the player, or as virtual status symbols. In the same way as points, badges also provide feedback, in that they indicate how the players have performed. Badges can influence players' behavior, leading them to select certain routes and challenges in order to earn badges that are associated with them. Additionally, as badges symbolize one's membership in a group of those who own this particular badge, they also can exert social influences on players and co-players, particularly if they are rare or hard to earn.

Leaderboards 
Leaderboards rank players according to their relative success, measuring them against a certain success criterion. As such, leaderboards can help determine who performs best in a certain activity and are thus competitive indicators of progress that relate the player's own performance to the performance of others. However, the motivational potential of leaderboards is mixed. Werbach and Hunter regard them as effective motivators if there are only a few points left to the next level or position, but as demotivators, if players find themselves at the bottom end of the leaderboard. Competition caused by leaderboards can create social pressure to increase the player's level of engagement and can consequently have a constructive effect on participation and learning. However, these positive effects of competition are more likely if the respective competitors are approximately at the same performance level.

Performance graphs 
Performance graphs, which are often used in simulation or strategy games, provide information about the players' performance compared to their preceding performance during a game. Thus, in contrast to leaderboards, performance graphs do not compare the player's performance to other players, but instead, evaluate the player's own performance over time. Unlike the social reference standard of leaderboards, performance graphs are based on an individual reference standard. By graphically displaying the player's performance over a fixed period, they focus on improvements. Motivation theory postulates that this fosters mastery orientation, which is particularly beneficial to learning.

Meaningful stories 
Meaningful stories are game design elements that do not relate to the player's performance. The narrative context in which a gamified application can be embedded contextualizes activities and characters in the game and gives them meaning beyond the mere quest for points and achievements. A story can be communicated by a game's title (e.g., Space Invaders) or by complex storylines typical of contemporary role-playing video games (e.g., The Elder Scrolls Series). Narrative contexts can be oriented towards real, non-game contexts or act as analogies of real-world settings. The latter can enrich boring, barely stimulating contexts, and, consequently, inspire and motivate players particularly if the story is in line with their personal interests. As such, stories are also an important part in gamification applications, as they can alter the meaning of real-world activities by adding a narrative ‘overlay’, e.g. being hunted by zombies while going for a run.

Avatars 
Avatars are visual representations of players within the game or gamification environment. Usually, they are chosen or even created by the player. Avatars can be designed quite simply as a mere pictogram, or they can be complexly animated, three- dimensional representations. Their main formal requirement is that they unmistakably identify the players and set them apart from other human or computer-controlled avatars. Avatars allow the players to adopt or create another identity and, in cooperative games, to become part of a community.

Teammates 
Teammates, whether they are other real players or virtual non-player characters, can induce conflict, competition or cooperation. The latter can be fostered particularly by introducing teams, i.e. by creating defined groups of players that work together towards a shared objective. Meta-analytic evidence supports that the combination of competition and collaboration in games is likely to be effective for learning.

The Game Element Hierarchy 
The described game elements fit within a broader framework, which involves three types of elements: Dynamics, Mechanics, and Components. These elements constitute The Game Element Hierarchy.

Dynamics are the highest in the hierarchy. They are the big picture aspects of the gamified system that should be considered and managed; however, they never directly enter into the game. Dynamics elements provide motivation through features such as narrative or social interaction.

Mechanics are the basic processes that drive the action forward and generate player engagement and involvement. Examples are chance, turns, and rewards.

Components are the specific instantiations of mechanics and dynamics; elements like points, quests, and virtual goods.

Applications 
Gamification has been applied to almost every aspect of life. Examples of gamification in business context include the U.S. Army, which uses military simulator America's Army as a recruitment tool, and M&M's "Eye Spy" pretzel game, launched in 2013 to amplify the company's pretzel marketing campaign by creating a fun way to "boost user engagement." Another example can be seen in the American education system. Students are ranked in their class based on their earned grade-point average (GPA), which is comparable to earning a high score in video games. Students may also receive incentives, such as an honorable mention on the dean's list, the honor roll, and scholarships, which are equivalent to leveling-up a video game character or earning virtual currency or tools that augment game success. 
Job application processes sometimes use gamification as a way to hire employees by assessing their suitability through questionnaires and mini games that simulate the actual work environment of that company.

Marketing 
Gamification has been widely applied in marketing. Over 70% of Forbes Global 2000 companies surveyed in 2013 said they planned to use gamification for the purposes of marketing and customer retention. For example, in November, 2011, Australian broadcast and online media partnership Yahoo!7 launched its Fango mobile app/SAP, which TV viewers use to interact with shows via techniques like check-ins and badges. Gamification has also been used in customer loyalty programs. In 2010, Starbucks gave custom Foursquare badges to people who checked in at multiple locations, and offered discounts to people who checked in most frequently at an individual store. As a general rule Gamification Marketing or Game Marketing usually falls under four primary categories;

1. Brandification (in-game advertising): Messages, images or videos promoting a Brand, Product or Service within a game's visuals components. According to NBCNews game creators Electronic Arts used "Madden 09" and "Burnout Paradise" to promote 'in-game' billboards encouraging players to vote.

2. Transmedia: The result of taking a media property and extending it into a different medium for both promotional and monetisation purposes. Nintendo's "007: GoldenEye" is a classic example. A video game created to advertise the originally titled movie. In the end, the promotional game brought in more money than the originally titled film.

3. Through-the-line (TTL) & Below-the-line (BTL): Text above, side or below main game screen (also known as an iFrame) advertising images or text. Example of this would be "I love Bees".

4. Advergames: Usually games based on popular mobile game templates, such as 'Candy Crush' or 'Temple Run'. These games are then recreated via platforms like WIX with software from the likes of Gamify, in order to promote Brands, Products and Services. Usually to encourage engagement, loyalty and product education. These usually involve social leaderboards and rewards that are advertised via social media platforms like Facebook's Top 10 games.

Gamification also has been used as a tool for customer engagement, and for encouraging desirable website usage behaviour. Additionally, gamification is applicable to increasing engagement on sites built on social network services. For example, in August, 2010, the website builder DevHub announced an increase in the number of users who completed their online tasks from 10% to 80% after adding gamification elements. On the programming question-and-answer site Stack Overflow users receive points and/or badges for performing a variety of actions, including spreading links to questions and answers via Facebook and Twitter. A large number of different badges are available, and when a user's reputation points exceed various thresholds, the user gains additional privileges, eventually including moderator privileges.

Inspiration 
Gamification can be used for ideation (structured brainstorming to produce new ideas). A study at MIT Sloan found that ideation games helped participants generate more and better ideas, and compared it to gauging the influence of academic papers by the numbers of citations received in subsequent research.

Health 

Applications like Fitocracy and QUENTIQ (Dacadoo) use gamification to encourage their users to exercise more effectively and improve their overall health. Users are awarded varying numbers of points for activities they perform in their workouts, and gain levels based on points collected. Users can also complete quests (sets of related activities) and gain achievement badges for fitness milestones. Health Month adds aspects of social gaming by allowing successful users to restore points to users who have failed to meet certain goals. Public health researchers have studied the use of gamification in self-management of chronic diseases and common mental disorders, STD prevention, and infection prevention and control.

In a review of health apps in the 2014 Apple App Store, more than 100 apps showed a positive correlation between gamification elements used and high user ratings. MyFitnessPal was named as the app that used the most gamification elements.

Reviewers of the popular location-based game Pokémon Go praised the game for promoting physical exercise. Terri Schwartz (IGN) said it was "secretly the best exercise app out there," and that it changed her daily walking routine. Patrick Allen (Lifehacker) wrote an article with tips about how to work out using Pokémon Go. Julia Belluz (Vox) said it could be the "greatest unintentional health fad ever," writing that one of the results of the game that the developers may not have imagined was that "it seems to be getting people moving." One study showed users took an extra 194 steps per day once they started using the app, approximately 26% more than usual. Ingress is a similar game that also requires a player to be physically active.  Zombies, Run!, a game in which the player is trying to survive a zombie apocalypse through a series of missions, requires the player to (physically) run, collect items to help the town survive, and listen to various audio narrations to uncover mysteries. Mobile, context-sensitive serious games for sports and health have been called exergames.

Work 
Gamification has been used in an attempt to improve employee productivity in healthcare, financial services, transportation, government, and others. In general, enterprise gamification refers to work situations where "game thinking and game-based tools are used in a strategic manner to integrate with existing business processes or information systems. And these techniques are used to help drive positive employee and organizational outcomes."

Crowdsourcing 

Crowdsourcing has been gamified in games like Foldit, a game designed by the University of Washington, in which players compete to manipulate proteins into more efficient structures. A 2010 paper in science journal Nature credited Foldit's 57,000 players with providing useful results that matched or outperformed algorithmically computed solutions. The ESP Game is a game that is used to generate image metadata. Google Image Labeler is a version of the ESP Game that Google has licensed to generate its own image metadata. Research from the University of Bonn used gamification to increase wiki contributions by 62%.

In the context of online crowdsourcing, gamification is also employed to improve the psychological and behavioral consequences of the solvers. According to numerous research, adding gamification components to a crowdsourcing platform can be considered as a design that shifts participants' focus from task completion to involvement motivated by intrinsic factors. Since the success of crowdsourcing competitions depends on a large number of participating solvers, the platforms for crowdsourcing provide motivating factors to increase participation by drawing on the concepts of the game.

Education and training

Gamification in the context of education and training is of particular interest because it offers a variety of benefits associated with learning outcomes and retention. Using video-game inspired elements like leaderboards and badges has been shown to be effective in engaging large groups and providing objectives for students to achieve outside of traditional norms like grades or verbal feedback. Online learning platforms such as Khan Academy and even physical schools like New York City Department of Education's Quest to Learn use gamification to motivate students to complete mission-based units and master concepts. There is also an increasing interest in the use of gamification in health sciences and education as an engaging information delivery tool and in order to add variety to revision.

With increased access to one-to-one student devices, and accelerated by pressure from the COVID-19 pandemic, many teachers from primary to post-secondary settings have introduced live, online quiz-show style games into their lessons.

Gamification has also been used to promote learning outside of schools. In August 2009, Gbanga launched a game for the Zurich Zoo where participants learned about endangered species by collecting animals in mixed reality. Companies seeking to train their customers to use their product effectively can showcase features of their products with interactive games like Microsoft's Ribbon Hero 2.

A wide range of employers including the United States Armed Forces, Unilever, and SAP currently use gamified training modules to educate their employees and motivate them to apply what they learned in trainings to their job. According to a study conducted by Badgeville, 78% of workers are utilizing games-based motivation at work and nearly 91% say these systems improve their work experience by increasing engagement, awareness and productivity. In the form of occupational safety training, technology can provide realistic and effective simulations of real-life experiences, making safety training less passive and more engaging, more flexible in terms of time management and a cost-effective alternative to practice.

Politics and terrorist groups 
Alix Levine, an American security consultant, reports that some techniques that a number of extremist websites such as Stormfront and various terrorism-related sites used to build loyalty and participation can be described as gamification. As an example, Levine mentioned reputation scores.

The Chinese government has announced that it will begin using gamification to rate its citizens in 2020, implementing a Social Credit System in which citizens will earn points representing trustworthiness. Details of this project are still vague, but it has been reported that citizens will receive points for good behavior, such as making payments on time and educational attainments.

Bellingcat contributor Robert Evans has written about the "gamification of terror" in the wake of the El Paso shooting, in an analysis of the role 8Chan and similar boards played in inspiring the massacre, as well as other acts of terrorism and mass shootings. According to Evans, "[w]hat we see here is evidence of the only real innovation 8chan has brought to global terrorism: the gamification of mass violence. We see this not just in the references to “high scores”, but in the very way the Christchurch shooting was carried out. Brenton Tarrant livestreamed his massacre from a helmet cam in a way that made the shooting look almost exactly like a First Person Shooter video game. This was a conscious choice, as was his decision to pick a sound-track for the spree that would entertain and inspire his viewers."

Technology design 
Traditionally, researchers thought of motivations to use computer systems to be primarily driven by extrinsic purposes; however, many modern systems have their use driven primarily by intrinsic motivations. Examples of such systems used primarily to fulfill users' intrinsic motivations, include online gaming, virtual worlds, online shopping, learning/education, online dating, digital music repositories, social networking, online pornography, and so on. Such systems are excellent candidates for further 'gamification' in their design. Moreover, even traditional management information systems (e.g., ERP, CRM) are being 'gamified' such that both extrinsic and intrinsic motivations must increasingly be considered.

As illustration, Microsoft has announced plans to use gamification techniques for its Windows Phone 7 operating system design. While businesses face the challenges of creating motivating gameplay strategies, what makes for effective gamification is a key question.

One important type of technological design in gamification is the player centered design. Based on the design methodology user-centered design, its main goal is to promote greater connectivity and positive behavior change between technological consumers. It has five steps that help computer users connect with other people online to help them accomplish goals and other tasks they need to complete. The 5 steps are: an individual or company has to know their player (their target audience),  identify their mission (their goal), understand human motivation (the personality, desires, and triggers of the target audience), apply mechanics (points, badges, leaderboards, etc.),  and to manage, monitor, and measure the way they are using their mechanics to ensure it is helping them achieve the desired outcome of their goal and that their goal is specific and realistic.

Authentication 

Gamification has also been applied to authentication. For example, the possibilities of using a game like Guitar Hero can help someone learn a password implicitly. Furthermore, games have been explored as a way to learn new and complicated passwords. It is suggested that these games could be used to "level up" a password, thereby improving its strength over time. Gamification has also been proposed as a way to select and manage archives. In 2013 Australian technology company Wynbox recorded success in the application of its gamification engine to the hotel booking process.

Online gambling 

Gamification has been used to some extent by online casinos. Some brands use an incremental reward system to extend the typical player lifecycle and to encourage repeat visits and cash deposits at the casino in return for rewards such as free spins and cash match bonuses on subsequent deposits.

History 
The term "gamification" first appeared online in the context of computer software in 2008. Gamification did not gain popularity until 2010.  Even prior to the term coming into use, other fields borrowing elements from videogames was common; for example, some work in learning disabilities and scientific visualization adapted elements from videogames.

The term "gamification" first gained widespread usage in 2010, in a more specific sense referring to incorporation of social/reward aspects of games into software. The technique captured the attention of venture capitalists, one of whom said he considered gamification the most promising area in gaming. Another observed that half of all companies seeking funding for consumer software applications mentioned game design in their presentations.

Several researchers consider gamification closely related to earlier work on adapting game-design elements and techniques to non-game contexts. Deterding et al. survey research in human–computer interaction that uses game-derived elements for motivation and interface design, and Nelson argues for a connection to both the Soviet concept of socialist competition, and the American management trend of "fun at work". Fuchs points out that gamification might be driven by new forms of ludic interfaces. Gamification conferences have also retroactively incorporated simulation; e.g. Will Wright, designer of the 1989 video game SimCity, was the keynote speaker at the gamification conference Gsummit 2013.

In addition to companies that use the technique, a number of businesses created gamification platforms. In October 2007, Bunchball, backed by Adobe Systems Incorporated, was the first company to provide game mechanics as a service, on Dunder Mifflin Infinity, the community site for the NBC TV show The Office. Bunchball customers have included Playboy, Chiquita, Bravo, and The USA Network. Badgeville, which offers gamification services, launched in late 2010, and raised $15 million in venture-capital funding in its first year of operation.

Gamification as an educational and behavior modification tool reached the public sector by 2012, when the United States Department of Energy co-funded multiple research trials, including consumer behavior studies, adapting the format of Programmed learning into mobile microlearning to experiment with the impacts of gamification in reducing energy use. Cultural anthropologist Susan Mazur-Stommen published a business case for applying games to addressing climate change and sustainability, delivering research which "...took many forms including card-games (Cool Choices), videogames (Ludwig), and games for mobile devices such as smartphones (Ringorang) [p.9]."

Gamification 2013, an event exploring the future of gamification, was held at the University of Waterloo Stratford Campus in October 2013.

Legal restrictions 

Through gamification's growing adoption and its nature as a data aggregator, multiple legal restrictions may apply to gamification. Some refer to the use of virtual currencies and virtual assets, data privacy laws and data protection, or labor laws.

The use of virtual currencies, in contrast to traditional payment systems, is not regulated. The legal uncertainty surrounding the virtual currency schemes might constitute a challenge for public authorities, as these schemes can be used by criminals, fraudsters and money launderers to perform their illegal activities.

A March 2022 consultation paper by the Board of the International Organization of Securities Commissions (IOSCO) questions whether some gamification tactics should be banned.

Criticism 
University of Hamburg researcher Sebastian Deterding has characterized the initial popular strategies for gamification as not being fun and creating an artificial sense of achievement. He also says that gamification can encourage unintended behaviours.

Poorly designed gamification in the workplace has been compared to Taylorism, and is considered a form of micromanagement.

In a review of 132 of the top health and fitness apps in the Apple app store, in 2014, using gamification as a method to modify behavior, the authors concluded that "Despite the inclusion of at least some components of gamification, the mean scores of integration of gamification components were still below 50 percent. This was also true for the inclusion of game elements and the use of health behavior theory constructs, thus showing a lack of following any clear industry standard of effective gaming, gamification, or behavioral theory in health and fitness apps."

Concern was also expressed in a 2016 study analyzing outcome data from 1,298 users who competed in gamified and incentivized exercise challenges while wearing wearable devices. In that study the authors conjectured that data may be highly skewed by cohorts of already healthy users, rather than the intended audiences of participants requiring behavioral intervention.

Game designers like Jon Radoff and Margaret Robertson have also criticized gamification as excluding elements like storytelling and experiences and using simple reward systems in place of true game mechanics.

Gamification practitioners have pointed out that while the initial popular designs were in fact mostly relying on simplistic reward approach, even those led to significant improvements in short-term engagement. This was supported by the first comprehensive study in 2014, which concluded that an increase in gamification elements correlated with an increase in motivation score, but not with capacity or opportunity/trigger scores.

The same study called for standardization across the app industry on gamification principles to improve the effectiveness of health apps on the health outcomes of users.

MIT Professor Kevin Slavin has described business research into gamification as flawed and misleading for those unfamiliar with gaming. Heather Chaplin, writing in Slate, describes gamification as "an allegedly populist idea that actually benefits corporate interests over those of ordinary people". Jane McGonigal has distanced her work from the label "gamification", listing rewards outside of gameplay as the central idea of gamification and distinguishing game applications where the gameplay itself is the reward under the term "gameful design".

"Gamification" as a term has also been criticized. Ian Bogost has referred to the term as a marketing fad and suggested "exploitation-ware" as a more suitable name for the games used in marketing. Other opinions on the terminology criticism have made the case why the term gamification makes sense.

In an article in the LA Times, the gamification of worker engagement at Disneyland was described as an "electronic whip". Workers had reported feelings similar to slavery behaviors and whipping sense.

See also 
Egoboo, a component of some gamification strategies

Notes

References

Further reading 

 Boller, Sharon; Kapp, Karl M. (2017). Play to Learn: Everything You Need to Know About Designing Effective Learning Games. ISBN 978-1562865771.
 
 
 
Gray, Dave; Brown, Sunni; Macanufo, James (2010). Gamestorming: A Playbook for Innovators, Rulebreakers, and Changemakers. ISBN 978-0596804176. 
 
 
 
 
 
 
 
 
 
 Routledge, Helen (2015). "Why Games Are Good For Business: How to Leverage the Power of Serious Games, Gamification and Simulations". Palgrave Macmillan.
 
 

 
Behavioral economics
Gaming
User interface techniques